Die Asche von Birkenau  is a poem by the writer Stephan Hermlin from his cycle Remembrance. It was set to music as a cantata in 1965 by Günter Kochan.

Poem 

It was written in 1949 during a visit to Auschwitz-Birkenau concentration camp and published in 1951. It is composed of five twelve-line stanzas. Hermlin deals with the Holocaust. The motifs are remembrance and forgetting.

The last stanza of the poem optimistically states:

The author expressed himself admonitively at the same time; in a 1979 interview he said:

Music

Origin 
At the time of the still ongoing 2nd Auschwitz Trials, the composer Günter Kochan created The Ashes of Birkenau for alto solo and orchestra (1965). He took his cue from the poem by Stephan Hermlin and divided his work into a total of seven movements, using the 4 stanzas as a basis and composing 3 additional instrumental parts. The key passage is the fourth movement with its .

Movements 
Andante rubato
Interludium I (Andante)
Allegro
Grave
Interlude II: Moderato
Vivace
Epilogue: Moderato

Orchestration 
soloist voice (alto), 2 flutes, 1 oboe, 2 clarinets, 2 bassoons, 2 horns, 2 trumpets, 1 trombone, 1 timpani, 1 percussion, 1 celesta, 1 piano, strings

Premiere 
The work was premiered on 25 May 1966 by the Berlin Symphony Orchestra conducted by Kurt Masur in Berlin. It has a duration of approximately 16 minutes.

Importance 
Kochan considered the Ashes of Birkenau to be one of his most important pieces. According to his own statements from the 1970s, the work was broadcast by more than seven radio stations. The cantata advanced to become one of the most important musical works dealing with the genocide of the Jews.

Recordings 
 Annelies Burmeister (contralto), Rundfunk-Sinfonieorchester Berlin, conductor: Kurt Masur (1967)
 Annelies Burmeister (contralto), Rundfunk-Sinfonieorchester Berlin, conductor: Wolf-Dieter Hauschild (1975)
 Annelies Burmeister (contralto), Leipzig Radio Symphony Orchestra, conductor: Herbert Kegel (1975)

Reception 
The Holocaust survivors Simon Wiesenthal wrote a text on the poem in 1979. In part, it said:

.

The text was worked into the turning stone in a spiral, so that the visitor is invited to circle the surface.

Further reading 
 Wilhelm Buschkötter, Hansjürgen Schaefer: Handbuch der internationalen Konzertliteratur. Instrumental- und Vokalmusik [Manual of international concert literature]. 2. überarbeitete und erweiterte Auflage, de Gruyter, Berlin, New York 1996, .
 Hans-Peter Müller: "Die Asche von Birkenau" zu Günter Kochans neuer Solo-Kantate. In Musik und Gesellschaft 16 (1966), .
 Klaus Wagenbach (ed.): Lesebuch Deutsche Literatur zwischen 1945 und 1959. Wagenbach, Berlin 1980, .

References 

Auschwitz concentration camp
Poems about the Holocaust
East German literature
Cantatas
1965 in music